Agios Eleftherios is a neighborhood of Athens, Greece.

The neighbourhood takes its name from the church of the same name on Acharnon Street.

Transport
Agios Eleftherios metro station on Line 1 of the Athens Metro serves the area.

Historical population

References

Neighbourhoods in Athens